Liberté is a Quebec literary magazine founded in 1959. The founders were Radio-Canada and National Film Board producers Hubert Aquin, André Belleau, Jacques Godbout, Fernand Ouellette, and editor Jean-Guy Pilon. Politically the magazine is centrist.

References

Literary magazines published in Canada
Magazines established in 1959
1959 establishments in Quebec
French-language magazines published in Canada
Magazines published in Quebec